Toma Marinică Niga (born 15 August 1997) is a Romanian professional footballer who plays as a goalkeeper for Liga III club Foresta Suceava.

Career statistics

Club
Statistics accurate as of match played 29 March 2019.

Honours

Club
FCSB
Cupa României: 2019–20

References

External links
 
 
 

1997 births
Living people
People from Suceava County
Romanian footballers
Association football goalkeepers
Liga I players
Liga II players
Liga III players
ACS Foresta Suceava players
FC Steaua București players
LPS HD Clinceni players
FC Hermannstadt players
FC Steaua II București players